Malas River is a river in Madang Province, Papua New Guinea.

See also
Malas language

Rivers of Papua New Guinea
Madang Province